Wang He (born 9 November 1988 in Beijing) is a male Chinese sports sailor who competed for Team China at the 2008 Summer Olympics.

Major performances
2005 Canadian Royal Sailing Club;
2005 Hainan Senior Sports School; and
2006 National Team.

References
 http://2008teamchina.olympic.cn/index.php/personview/personsen/5145

1988 births
Living people
Chinese male sailors (sport)
Olympic sailors of China
Sportspeople from Beijing
Sailors at the 2008 Summer Olympics – Star